Rubens Vanderlei Tavares Cardoso (born September 6, 1976, in São Paulo), is a Brazilian retired  left wingback is the current assistant manager of Brasil de Pelotas.

Honours

Player 
Grêmio
 Campeonato Gaúcho: 2001 
 Copa do Brasil: 2001

Internacional
 FIFA Club World Cup: 2006
 Copa Libertadores: 2006

Coritiba
 Campeonato Paranaense: 2008

References 

1976 births
Living people
Brazilian footballers
Brazilian football managers
Association football defenders
Campeonato Brasileiro Série A players
Guarani FC players
Santos FC players
Grêmio Foot-Ball Porto Alegrense players
Sociedade Esportiva Palmeiras players
Clube Atlético Mineiro players
Sport Club Internacional players
Coritiba Foot Ball Club players
Esporte Clube Bahia players
Sertãozinho Futebol Clube players
Jabaquara Atlético Clube players
Footballers from São Paulo